Matt Nelson may refer to:

Matt Nelson (American football) (born 1995), American football player
Matthew Nelson (musician) (born 1967), American singer-songwriter
Matthew Nelson (soccer) (born 1977), American soccer goalkeeper

See also
Matheu Nelson (born 1999), American baseball player